Risqué is the third studio album by American disco band Chic, released on Atlantic Records on July 30, 1979. One of the records that defined the disco era, the album became highly influential not only within the movement, but also in other styles such as hip hop, art rock and new wave. In 2020, Rolling Stone ranked the album at number 414 on their list of the 500 Greatest Albums of All Time.

Release

Risqué includes three classic Chic hits; "Good Times" (#1 US Pop, #1 US R&B June 23, 1979, #5 UK), "My Forbidden Lover" (#33 US R&B, #43 US Pop October 13, 1979, #15 UK) and "My Feet Keep Dancing" (#42 US R&B, #101 US Pop December 8, 1979, #21 UK). Risqué reached #5 on the US albums chart and #2 on the US R&B chart. It has been certified Platinum by the RIAA for sales over 1 million copies. It peaked at #29 in the UK and was certified Silver by the BPI.

Risqué was released on compact disc by Atlantic Records/Warner Music in 1991 (catalogue number 7567-80406-2). The album was digitally remastered and re-issued by Warner Music Japan in 2011.

Critical Reception 
Risqué received widespread critical acclaim for its lyrics and tone. In a review for BBC, Daryl Easlea called the album "one of the greatest exhibits in the case for disco's defence," and saying that it was "Chic's most sustained artistic statement, a celebration of a 70s that was collapsing under its own excess and hedonism."

Legacy
"Good Times" has been extensively sampled in other artists' works, most notably in the first top 40 rap single, "Rapper's Delight" by Sugarhill Gang, that same year. "Will You Cry" was sampled in "Just a Moment" by Nas from the 2004 album Street's Disciple.

Accolades
The information regarding accolades attributed to Risqué is adapted from Acclaimed Music, except where otherwise noted.

Track listing

Personnel 
 Alfa Anderson – lead vocals (1, 4, 6, 7)
 Luci Martin – lead vocals (1, 3, 4, 5)
 Fonzi Thornton – vocals
 Michelle Cobbs – backing vocals
 Ullanda McCullough – backing vocals
 Raymond Jones – keyboards
 Robert Sabino – keyboards
 Andy Schwartz – keyboards
 Nile Rodgers – guitars, vocals
 Bernard Edwards – bass guitar, lead vocals (3)
 Tony Thompson – drums
 Sammy Figueroa – percussion
 Jean Fineberg – saxophones
 Alex Foster – saxophones
 Barry Rogers – trombone
 Jon Faddis – trumpet
 Ellen Seeling – trumpet
 The Chic Strings:
 Valerie Heywood – strings
 Cheryl Hong – strings
 Karen Karlsrud – strings
 Karen Milne – strings
 Gene Orloff – concertmaster

Tap Dancers on "My Feet Keep Dancing"
 Eugene Jackson
 Fayard Nicholas
 Sammy Warren

Production 
 Bernard Edwards – producer for Chic Organization Ltd., arrangements and conductor 
 Nile Rodgers – producer for Chic Organization Ltd., arrangements and conductor 
 Bob Clearmountain – sound engineer
 Jim Galante – assistant engineer
 Jeff Hendrickson – assistant engineer
 Peter Robbins – assistant engineer
 Jackson Schwartz – assistant engineer
 Raymond Willard – assistant engineer
 Dennis King – mastering
 Carin Goldberg – art direction
 Ken Ambrose – photography
 All songs recorded and mixed at The Power Station (New York, NY). 
 Additional recording at Electric Lady Studios (New York, NY) and Kendun Recorders (Burbank, CA).
 Mastered at Atlantic Studios (New York, NY).

Certifications

References

External links

 Risqué (Adobe Flash) at Radio3Net (streamed copy where licensed)

Chic (band) albums
1979 albums
Atlantic Records albums
Albums produced by Nile Rodgers
Albums produced by Bernard Edwards